The Iglesia ni Cristo Museum is a museum in Punta, Santa Ana, Manila. The building of the museum was originally used as a place of worship and is the first local congregation of the Iglesia ni Cristo and is now used as a museum by the church. It is the location where founder Felix Manalo first preached about the Iglesia in 1914.

References

Iglesia ni Cristo Museum, Santa Ana, Manila
Churches in Manila
Former churches in the Philippines
Museums in Manila
Buildings and structures in Santa Ana, Manila
Religious museums in the Philippines